"Tell Me Something Bad About Tulsa" is a song written by Red Lane. It was first recorded by American country music artist Merle Haggard on his 1986 album, Out  Among the Stars. Haggard's son, Noel Haggard, covered the song on his 1997 debut album, One Lifetime, and released it as his second single. It peaked at number 75 on the Billboard Hot Country Singles & Tracks chart in August 1997. Noel Haggard's version was released through Atlantic Records and was produced by Barry Beckett.

George Strait also recorded a version of the song for his 2003 album, Honkytonkville. Released as the album's first single, Strait's rendition peaked at number 11 on the Billboard Hot Country Singles & Tracks chart in July 2003.

Chart performance

Noel Haggard

George Strait
"Tell Me Something Bad About Tulsa" debuted at number 48 on the U.S. Billboard Hot Country Singles & Tracks for the week of April 12, 2003.

Year-end charts

References

1986 songs
1997 singles
2003 singles
Merle Haggard songs
Noel Haggard songs
George Strait songs
Song recordings produced by Tony Brown (record producer)
Atlantic Records singles
MCA Nashville Records singles
Songs written by Red Lane
Songs about Tulsa, Oklahoma
Song recordings produced by Barry Beckett